Bitnation, or cryptonation, is a "voluntary nation" that records vital records, identity and other legal events using blockchain technology. Bitnation was founded in 2014 using Ethereum smart contract technology.

History

Bitnation founder Susanne Tarkowski Tempelhof grew up in a Franco-Swedish family where her father had been stateless for a decade. She was inspired by blockchain technology and Bitcoin inspired her to extend it into education and national security, which gradually evolved into the backbone concepts of the modern startup company Bitnation. Bitnation was founded 14 July 2014 by Tempelhof.

Media
Bitnation was the subject of a Vice piece in September 2016 wherein the author noted that "because a nation is as much an ideological concept as it is a legal one, one strength of Bitnation lies in its ability to give agency to groups who have been ignored or repressed by modern nation-states."

The Atlantic noted in February 2018 "Bitnation [is] proposing a 'peer-to-peer voluntary governance system' to replace the arbitrariness of birth as the decider of one’s citizenship. Blockchain governance could allow for the creation of virtual citizenship and autonomous communities distinct from territorial nation-states."

Bitnation also received notable coverage in The Economist and The Wall Street Journal for its experimental work in using blockchain technology to solve the migrant crisis.

Awards and accolades

In April 2017, Bitnation's BRER (BitNation Refugee Emergency Response) programme was one of those awarded by the Grand Prix 2017, an annual Netexplo Forum prize co-organized by UNESCO.

References

Bibliographies
The Googlement: A Do-It-Yourself Guide to Starting Your Own Nation (and Changing the World) (2014), Susanne Tarkowski Tempelhof, Nortia Press (English) 
Swarmwise (14 February 2013), Rick Falkvinge, Chapter 1–6, English, online journal

External links

 
 
 

Micronations
Internet properties established in 2014
Swiss companies established in 2014
Swiss websites
Identity documents
Blockchain entities
Bitcoin
Fictional countries
Fictional organizations